William Cummin Clark is the Harvey Brooks Professor of International Science, Public Policy and Human Development at the John F. Kennedy School of Government, Harvard University.

William Clark known for his long-term efforts to promote sustainability science.  He co-chaired the US National Research Council report on Sustainability ‘Our Common Journey,” and in 2016 co-authored a textbook on Sustainability Science.  He is also established and is now co-editor of its sustainability science section of the scientific journal Proceedings of the National Academy of Sciences.  He co-leads the Sustainability Science Program at Harvard , and he is also on the board of directors of the Julie Ann Wrigley Global Institute of Sustainability at Arizona State University.

Awards
Clark is a member of the USA’s National Academy of Sciences and a Fellow of the American Association for the Advancement of Science.  He received a MacArthur Fellowship in 1983.  He received an honorary doctorate from Leuphana University in 2012 for his work on sustainability science.

Education 
He earned a BSc from Yale in 1971 and a PhD in Ecology from University of British Columbia in 1979.

References

MacArthur Fellows
Members of the United States National Academy of Sciences
1948 births
Living people
People from Greenwich, Connecticut
University of British Columbia alumni
Harvard Kennedy School faculty
American ecologists